is a contemporary artist, printmaker and educator. He is widely considered to be Japan’s most important living print-artist, and one of the most successful contemporary print artists in the world. He is a professor emeritus of the Tokyo University of the Arts. Noda is most well-known for his visual autobiographical works done as a series of woodblock, print, and silkscreened diary entries that capture moments in daily life. His innovative method of printmaking involves photographs scanned through a mimeograph machine and then printed the images over the area previously printed by traditional woodblock print techniques onto the Japanese paper. Although this mixed-media technique is quite prosaic today, Noda was the first artist to initiate this breakthrough. Noda is the nephew of Hideo Noda an oil painter and muralist.

Early life, family and education
Noda was born in the Shiranui Township of Uki, Kumamoto Prefecture, on 5 March 1940. In 1959, he entered the Department of Oil Painting, Faculty of Fine Arts, Tokyo National University of Fine Arts and Music (presently Tokyo National University of Fine Arts and Music), and graduated in 1963. In 1965, Noda completed graduate course at the Tokyo National University of Fine Arts and Music. Noda was a student of Tadashige Ono in the art of woodblock printmaking.

In June 1971, Noda married Dorit Bartur, the daughter of Moshe Bartur, then the Israeli ambassador to Japan. In 1972, their first son Izaya was born in October; and in 1974 their first daughter Rika was born in November.

Career
 1968 At the age of 28, Noda won the International Grand Prize at the Tokyo International Print Biennale for diptych Dairy: August 22, 1968 and Diary: September 11, 1968. 
 1977 Appointed lecturer in the Faculty of Art, Tokyo National University of Fine Arts and Music.
 1981 Promoted associate professor in the Faculty of Art, Tokyo National University of Fine Arts and Music, Japan.

 1991 Became professor in the Faculty of Art, Tokyo National University of Fine Arts and Music, Japan.
 1993 Gave lecture and workshops as a visiting artist at Macau Academy of Visual Arts, China.
 1996 Appointed international judge at the 10th Seoul International Biennial of Print, South Korea
 1998 Gave lecture and workshops as a visiting artist at the Columbia University, New York, United States of America.
 2007 Retired as Professor Emeritus at the Tokyo University of the Arts.

Awards 
 1968 International Grand Prize at the Tokyo International Print Biennale
 1970 Warsaw National Museum Prize at the Krakow International Print Biennale
 1972 2nd Prize at the Norwegian International Print Biennale
 1974 Łódź Museum Prize at the Krakow International Print Biennale
 1974 2nd Prize at the Norwegian International Print Biennale
 1976 Prize of the Museum of Modern Art, Hyogo at the Tokyo International Print Biennale
 1977 Grand Prize at the Ljubliana International Print Biennale
 1978 Grand Prize at the Norwegian International Print Biennale
 1980 Łódź Museum Prize at the Krakow International Print Biennale
 1981 Belgrade Contemporary Museum Prize at the Ljubliana International Print Biennale
 1981 Exhibition Prize at the Graphica Criativa, Finland
 1984 Gold Medal at the Norwegian International Print Biennale
 1986 Friends of Bradford Art Galleries and Museums Prize at the British International Print Biennale
 1987 Grand Prize of Honor at the Ljubliana International Print Biennale 
 1993 Gen Yamaguchi Memorial Grand Prize, Numazu City
 2003 Awarded with the Medal with Purple Ribbon by the Government of Japan
 2015 Awarded The Order of the Sacred Treasure, Gold Rays with Neck Ribbon by the Emperor of Japan

Major exhibitions 
 1969 (G) Ljubljana International Print Biennale, Yugoslavia
 1970 (G) British International Print Biennale, United Kingdom
 1971 (G) Sao Paulo Biennale, Brazil
 1972 (G) Venice Biennale: Graphic International, Italy
 1973 (S) Soker-Kaseman Gallery, San Francisco, United States of America
 1976 (G) Arakawa Shusaka, Ikeda Masuo, Noda Tetsuya (Cincinnati Art Museum), United States of America 
 1976 (G) Frechen International Print Biennale, Germany
 1978 (S) Fuji Television Gallery, Tokyo, Japan
 1978 (G) Norwegian International Print Biennale, Norway
 1979 (S) Foire Internationale d'Art Contemporain, Grand Palais, Paris, France
 1979 (G) Contemporary Japanese Art (Beijing & Shanghai), China
 1979 (S) Soker-Kaseman Gallery, San Francisco, United States of America
 1980 (S) Ikeda Museum of 20th Century Art, Shizuoka, Japan
 1980 (S) Marina Dinkler Gallery, Berlin, Germany
 1980 (G) Printed Art: A View of Two Decades (Museum of Modern Art, New York), United States of America
 1981 (S) Gallery S. 65, Belgium
 1981 (G) International Art Biennale, Valparaiso, Chile
 1983 (S) Gallery 39, London, United Kingdom
 1983 (G) Japanese Print Since 1900 (British Museum), United Kingdom
 1984 (S) Tikotin Museum of Japanese Art, Haifa, Israel
 1985 (G) Japanese Contemporary Art (National Gallery of Modern Art, New Delhi), India
 1987 (S) Fuji Television Gallery, Japan
 1988 (S) Old Jim Gallery, Vanderbilt University, United States of America
 1989 (S) Ljubljana International Print Biennale - TETSUYA NODA, International Centre of Graphic Arts (Ljubljana)(MGLC), Yugoslavia
 1990 (S) Australian National University Drill Hall Gallery, Canberra, Australia
 1990 (G) Japanese Prints of 20th Century, Reformist and Tradition" (Cincinnati Art Museum)
 1995 (G) La Serigraphie Au Rendez-Vous (Galerie Dimmers, Bruxelles), Belgium
 1996 (S) Patrick Cramer, Geneve, Switzerland
 1996 (S) Don Soker Contemporary Art, San Francisco, United States of America
 1997 (S) Shiyoda Gallery, Shizuoka, Japan
 1998 (S) Gallery Goto, Tokyo, Japan
 1998 (G) Photo Image: Printmaking 60s to 90s (Museum of Fine Arts, Boston), United States of America 
 1999 (S) Gallery Seijo, Sendai, Japan
 2000 (S) Sakanomachi Museum, Toyama, Japan
 2001 (S) Museum of Small Dreams, Yonago, Tottori, Japan
 2001 (S) Aizawa Museum, Niigata, Japan
 2002 (S) Museum Chiran, Kagoshima, Japan
 2003 (G) “MOT Annual 2003 - DAYS”, Museum of Contemporary Art, Tokyo, Japan
 2003 (S) "Tetsuya Noda", Central Academy of Fine Arts Museum, Beijing, China
 2004 (S) "Days in a Life", The Art of Tetsuya Noda, Asian Art Museum, San Francisco, United States of America
 2005 (S) "Print World of Tetsuya Noda", Uki Municipal Shiranuhi Museum of Art, Kumamoto, Japan
 2006 (S) "Tetsuya Noda - Diary", Contemporary Center of Graphic Art, Japan
 2006 (G) "Contemporary Prints, Transformation of Photographic Image"(National Museum of Modern Art, Tokyo), Japan
 2006 (G) "Connoisseurship of Japanese Prints: Part I (The Art Institute of Chicago), United States of America
 2007 (S) "Tetsuya Noda - Diary", University Museum, Tokyo University of the Arts, Japan
 2008 (S) Ardel Gallery, Bangkok, Thailand
 2009 (S) Gallery Itsutsuji, Tokyo, Japan
 2010 (G) Emerging Japanese Print Artists of the 1960s, 70s, and Beyond, The Art Institute of Chicago, United States of America
 2010 (G) "Contemporary Japanese Printmaking Exhibition" (Zhejiang Art Museum), China
 2011 (S) Andrew Bae Gallery, Chicago, United States of America
 2012 (S) "Tetsuya Noda", Museum of Modern Art, Wakayama, Japan
 2012 (G) "Contemporary Water-Based Woodblock Prints", (Suzhou Museum), China
 2013 (S) "Print Works by Tetsuya Noda: from the Museum Collection, Kumamoto, Japan
 2013 (S) "Tetsuya Noda", Hokusai Museum, Kazo, Japan
 2014 (S) "Noda Tetsuya's 'Diary'", British Museum, United Kingdom 
 2015 (S) "Tetsuya Noda - Diary II", Ardel Gallery of Modern Art, Bangkok, Thailand
 2016 (S) "Diary of Tetsuya Noda: Steven Co Collection", Ayala Museum, Philippines 
 2017 (G) "Paint By Numbers", Jewish Institute of Religion, New York, United States of America
 2017 (S) "Tetsuya Noda - Best of 'Diary'", Kashiwa Civic Art Gallery, Japan
 2017 (G) "Light/Matter: The Intersection of Photography and Printmaking", Grunwald Gallery of Art, Indiana University Bloomington, United States of America 
 2018 (G) "43 Works Reunited", Museo de la Solidaridad Salvador Allende, Santiago, Chile
 2019 (S) "World According to Tetsuya Noda", Andrew Bae Gallery, Chicago, United States of America
 2019 (G) "Bientôt déjà hier - Métamorphoses et écoulement du temps", Centre de la Gravure et de l’Image imprimée, La Louvière, Belgium 
 2019 (S) "Tetsuya Noda Exhibition - Retrospective", Gallery Itsutsuji, Tokyo, Japan
 2019 (S) "Your Hand In Mine - Tetsuya Noda (Diary) Selected Works: Steven Co Collection", organized by Arts Empowering Lab (At Light Gallery), Macau, China 
 2020 (S) "Noda Tetsuya: My Life in Print", The Art Institute of Chicago, United States of America
 2020 (S) "Tetsuya Noda Print 'Diary' Series", The Ueno Royal Museum, Tokyo, Japan
 2021 (S) "Tetsuya Noda's Print Works I: From His Daily Life - From The Ueno Royal Museum Collection", Ueno Royal Museum, Tokyo, Japan
 2021 (G) "Spirit Labor: Duration, Difficulty, and Affect", Garage Museum of Contemporary Art, Moscow, Russia
 2021-2023 (G) "Human Image: Masterpieces of Figurative Art" (La Imagen Humana: Arte, Identidades Y Simbolismo), in collaboration with the British Museum, La CaixaForum, Madrid, Sevilla, Zaragoza, Palma, Barcelona, Spain
 2022 (S) "Noda Tetsuya’s Diary of Contemporary Japanese Prints" (Steven Co Collection), University Museum and Art Gallery, The University of Hong Kong, Hong Kong SAR, China
 2022 (S) "Noda Tetsuya: The Renie and James Grohl Family Collection, Medici Museum of Art, Ohio, United States of America
 2022 (S) "Tetsuya Noda's Print Works II: Wrapping or Unwrapping - From The Ueno Royal Museum Collection", Ueno Royal Museum, Tokyo, Japan
 2022 (S) "Tetsuya Noda : A Variation of Mimeograph" (Steven Co Collection), Hong Kong Open Printshop, Hong Kong SAR, China 

(S) = SOLO EXHIBITION, 
(G) = GROUP EXHIBITION

Works 
In the British Museum Magazine, Timothy Clark, the keeper of Japanese section wrote “In nearly fifty years, Noda has created some 500 further works that continue his mesmerizing ‘Diary’ series, using the unique combination of color woodblock and photo-based silkscreen onto handmade Japanese paper that he has made his own. Personal snapshots are rigorously reworked to become subtle mementos of universal significance: ‘what’s in a life?’ we are constantly prompted to ask.”

In the video entitled "Making Beauty: Noda Tetsuya", published by The British Museum on October 11, 2018, Noda and Clark discuss the concept and technique used in achieving the look and feel of the Noda's works.

Concept 
Since 1968, Noda’s works have been inspired by themes of his own life. It is a visual autobiography and the motif is a comment on his daily life - his family, people he knows, his children’s growth and scenery along his way. He takes photographs of what he sees and likes, then develops and retouches them with pencil or brushes. His works are done using materials close at hand.

On the concept of visual autobiography, Robert Flynn Johnson stated, "To think that one's life is important enough to make it the focus of one's art can be an act of pure folly and egotistical pride or it can involve a humbling and sincere self-examination that draw on observation of small universal truths. It is clear that in a career of nearly forty years of creating an artistic world made at paper and ink, Tetsuya Noda has followed the latter, quieter path."

In the age of social media, some critics are quick to see the parallelism of Noda's visual autobiography and popular social media sites. In 2016, a newspaper pointed out "In this era of social networking, it isn’t unusual for our friends to frequently post photos of the mundane happenings of our lives—a laughing baby, a just-read book, our lunch, a selfie—on Facebook, Instagram, or Snapchat. But for renowned contemporary Japanese artist Tetsuya Noda, documenting the ordinary details of his daily life is something he has done for almost 50 years."

When asked about how he found his theme; “Diary as an opportunity”, he replied, “at the university I was not at all satisfied with the assignment of painting nudes, it did not seem the right way to express myself.” His independent thinking and determination were highly rewarded. “I started to use a mimeograph cutting machine for the photo images in addition to the woodblock printmaking techniques.” In 1968, four years after he graduated from the university, he received the International Grand Prize at the 6th Tokyo International Print Biennale; “for the audacious combination of photography with traditional woodblock print."

Techniques 
Each print is created through a unique and multilayered method he himself developed. He begins by selecting a photograph, taken on the day of the title, that he manipulates in various ways. First he adds drawn elements—such as lines or shading—and whites out other aspects of the image. The altered photo is then scanned in an old-fashioned mimeograph machine, a process that creates a stencil of the image. Next Noda takes a sheet of handmade Japanese paper which he uses for all of his prints and applies subtle color through traditional woodblock technique. Finally he silkscreens his manipulated photo over the top and adds his signature, his name along with an inked thumbprint.

Photography 
On the use of photographs, Noda concluded the difference between his approach to photography and that of the Pop artist, "Andy Warhol used photographs of Marilyn Monroe and Jacqueline Onassis (then Kennedy), but notice that the subjects are famous people, and the photographs themselves had already appeared dozens of times in the mass media. I never use photos taken by other people. My photos are all my own." Japanese art critic Yoshiaki Tono (one of the “three greats” of Japanese art criticism) pointed out that "Where the Pop artists are concerned with America, with the iconography of a particular age and culture, with anonymous colloquialisms, Noda deals with something much more personal. His main subject is ordinariness - the ordinariness of individual people. Warhol's "Jackie" is the face of a whole period in American life. Imposed on it is an image of Americana during the convulsive sixties. Noda's 1968 prints are of a different dimension."

Education 
As an educator, April Vollmer, artist and author of "Japanese Woodblock Print Workshop: A Modern Guide to the Ancient Art of Mokuhanga" wrote, "Today most art training takes place in universities, and two prominent Japanese artists—Tetsuya Noda at Tokyo University of the Arts (Tokyo Geijutsu Daigaku) and Akira Kurosaki at Kyoto Seika University—are largely responsible for the new international wave of Mokuhanga (Woodblock printing in Japan) awareness. Noda headed the woodblock department at Tokyo Geidai from 1991 until his retirement in 2007. Cultural exchange and the promotion of Japanese art forms are both part of the university’s mission, and Noda spearheaded an innovative program in which traditional Ukiyo-e master printers came each year from the Adachi Institute to work with students, providing a link between the traditional workshop system and the modern university. He also nurtured contacts with the West, and his 2004 retrospective at the San Francisco Museum of Asian Art clearly showed the influence of his study of Western art, combining Mokuhanga backgrounds photo-screenprinted scenes of everyday life. In 1998 Noda came to Columbia University’s LeRoy Neiman Center for Print Studies to teach mokuhanga to New York area printmakers. Many of the artists now teaching mokuhanga internationally studied with Noda, including Seiichiro Miida (who has now taken Noda’s place at Tokyo Geidai), Raita Miyadera (also at Tokyo Geidai), Michael Schneider (Austria), Tyler Starr (US), Roslyn Kean (Australia), and others from Turkey to Korea to Pakistan."

Evaluation 
Lawrence Smith, formerly Keeper of Japanese Antiquities at The British Museum wrote, "He is a master in at least four artistic genres , all of them closely related to painting. If considered as a printmaker, no Japanese can remotely equal his range of subject… Noda is unquestionably the greatest Japanese printmaker alive. But if considered as a creator of work very close to painting, one has also to ask what living Japanese could be considered his equal… but in my view not one of them can rival his remarkable range of subjects and emotions".

Edward Lucie-Smith, English art critic, curator and broadcaster, on “Japanese artists who have built major international careers”, and in the context of Yayoi Kusama’s “distinctively Japanese extension of the Pop sensibility”, and Takashi Murakami’s “traditionally Japanese origins of their imagery”, situated between them is, “Another well-known Japanese artist who stresses the international, cross-cultural aspect of his work is Tetsuya Noda. Noda’s visual diaries tell the story of his mixed marriage to an Israeli woman, using photo-based imagery. the most obviously Japanese thing about them is their immaculately skillful use of print-making techniques.”

Mário Pedrosa, preeminent critic of art, culture, and politics and one of Latin America's most frequently cited public intellectuals, in a letter to Noda, praised, "Since the Bienal (sic) of Prints, when I had the joy of taking contact with your creative work, I always thought of how original and strong was the expression of your art.”

Daniel Bell talking about the originality of Noda's prints says, "Noda's distinctiveness lies in three things: the remarkably consistent subject matter of his work, the structure and configurations of his compositions, and the novel techniques, consciously derived from Ukiyo-e, as the means of realizing his intentions."

Robert Flynn Johnson, curator in charge of the Achenbach Foundation for Graphic Arts at the Fine Arts Museums of San Francisco wrote, “it is Tetsuya Noda who stands as the most original, innovative, and thought-provoking Japanese printmaker of his era".

Steven Co, art collector wrote, "Tetsuya Noda’s Diary Series is a visual map of temporal, personal, experiential, and lyrical moments. Noda strives to preserve memory with the objectivity of his camera, but then disrupts the resulting photograph with the subjectivity of his pencils and brushes before committing the memory to a print. As if to ensure that a memory is engraved into his mind, he would repeatedly retreat to that memory with rigor and vigor by personally pulling each print by hand. The result and effect are quiet and understated accounts of memories revisited, reassessed, and repeatedly asserted through this labor-intensive process. Mr. Noda’s works are as much about the process of making them as the pleasingly introspective and sensitive result of a single work or his whole body of works".

Yusuke Nakahara, art critic (one of the “three greats” of Japanese art criticism), wrote on Tetsuya Noda's use of photograph in his works, "Noda has succeeded in capturing the unique quality that had been captured in any other photographic art work before which could only be seen through a camera. This is the special quality that Noda possesses that others have difficulty to realize in their work. That is the recollective quality that a photograph evokes which one must say gives a photograph its unique quality. This recollected quality is none other than the ability that a photograph has, to record an event, that brings out the human emotion, and in Noda's works I feel that these feelings are strongly expressed."

Professor Linda C. Ehrlich, when writing on the relationship of Japanese visual arts and Japanese cinema, stressed not to overlook the influence of the more contemporary “creative print” (sōsaku-hanga) on Japanese films that feature a formalistic playfulness and daringness. Ehrlich stated that, “Noda Tetsuya’s large-scale diary pages based on family photographs, with their seemingly mundane, yet resonant, themes.” invokes J. Thomas Rimer’s view on sōsaku-hanga’s sense of “muted realism” and “a sense of craft rooted in instinctive apprehension of the power, the wholeness, of nature itself.” And it is this sense of “muted realism,” in which “the wholeness of nature and the everyday are joyfully celebrated.”

Emmanuel Madec, on his analysis of Tetsuya Noda's work, the photographer and curator wrote, "At first sight, his approach is that of a diarist. In Noda’s case, it is about an enumeration of daily objects, places, events whose banality is counterbalanced by the scale of the works. The status of subjects and objects is reversed. Diary; Feb. 14th '92 shows us an ashtray cluttered with many cigarette butts, which obviously is of great triviality; but the point of view adopted for the photograph makes it graphically remarkable. It is the format of this image (89.6 x 129.5 cm) that gives an aura to this object of which, while so commonplace at first sight, puts it front and centre as a marker of time. The object is now not only an object, it becomes a situation. With Noda, he is first a photographer. Taking pictures serves the need to check on reality. Then, discovering the image always comes from the separation between reality, memory and image, between which we can witness the gaps. But what is most striking here is that the process is transversely extended from engraving and then to screen printing. Extending the photographic image to a second medium is both over-appropriation and over-exploitation of the matter / image to extract possibilities. Noda's images thus pose as hybrids, the fruit of interbreeding between photography and engraving, propitious to probing into the profound essence of existence. Because Tetsuya Noda’s Diary is part of an elaboration of time: time of existence and time of the work that the serial reproduction confirms; therefore a proof and affirmation of the personal history of its author, as imprint of his attempt to take on time."

Gilles Bechet, an art critic, wrote "Contemplative explorer of everyday life, the Japanese artist (Tetsuya Noda) transposes his works into a diary in images of a disturbing sweetness that mix photography, drawing, screen printing and woodblock. An overflowing ashtray, fruits from the market, a shelf full of banal objects or candid portraits of his daughter, their pictorial treatment acquired the density of suspended time. A time that will not come back but remains archived forever." "

Joey Ho Chong I, art curator, wrote "Noda's Diary series reminds me of an adapted quote from Qing dynasty poet ZhaWeiren: what used to be the zither, chess, wine and flowers in calligraphy and painting; is now the rice, oil, salt, sauce, vinegar and tea. It is extraordinary that ordinary things in life, under the unique interpretation of Noda, can possess such intelligence and timelessness, making things strange yet intimate. His works allow us to walk through his life and make us feel as if we were part of him or his family. We can silently experience his joys and sorrows, and quietly walk along with him through his life journey. It is his ability to negotiate with that close and distant home in his heart that allows us to understand the meaning of life in the ordinary."

Janice Katz, Associate Curator of Japanese Art at the Art Institute Chicago wrote, “his focus on familiar and personal imagery almost feels like an attempt to stop time. The intensely personal subject matter of his images are in contrast to his printmaking technique, which renders his subjects mysterious and veiled. They are a bit hazy and unclear, creating a distance between the viewer and the image. The loving care that Noda expends on the creation of a print, making it beautiful and detailed, infusing it with mystery and uncertainty, makes me think that he is not preserving memory so much as creating the scene the way it appears in his memory. In the process of creation, he gets to spend more time with each of these moments—the wish of every parent, surely—even as he alters them."

Andrey Misiano, curator of Spirit Labor: Duration, Difficulty, and Affect show at Garage Museum of Contemporary Art wrote, "Each work in this series of over 500 is a rare type of contemporary still life, capturing stories that convey a sense of the time and make us reflect on the finite nature of every moment as it irreversibly becomes history."

Dr. Florian Knothe, Director of the University Museum and Art Gallery, The University of Hong Kong, wrote "Noda's work is technically accomplished and thematically exceedingly personal. Known for being a representative of the long tradition of printmaking in Japan, and as an innovator for the further development of the long-practiced genre, Noda's work combines photography, traditional Japanese woodblock printing, mimeograph duplication and silkscreen printing in a self-invented and precisely controlled process of layering... Thematically, Noda represents landscapes, domestic scenes and still-lifes, as well as - and more importantly - portraits of himself, family and friends, which are markers of specific moments in time, such as the more recent diary illustrations for March 13th and May 10th, created during the pandemic."

Public collections 
Tetsuya Noda's works are widely collected around the world by both generalist museums (national museums, fine art museums, modern art museum and contemporary art museums) and specialist museums (photography, print and graphic art).

 Art Gallery of New South Wales
 Centre de la Gravure et de l'Image imprimée (Belgium)
 Art Gallery of Greater Victoria
 University of Alberta Museums
 Museo de la Solidaridad Salvador Allende, Santiago (Chile)
 Tikotin Museum of Japanese Art, Haifa (Israel)
 National Museum of Modern Art, Tokyo
 National Museum of Modern Art, Kyoto
 National Museum of Art, Osaka
 Tokyo Metropolitan Museum of Photography
 Museum of Contemporary Art, Tokyo
 Museum of Modern Art, Wakayama
 Contemporary Art Museum, Kumamoto
 Gyeonggi Museum of Modern Art (South Korea)
 Muzeum Sztuki in Łódź (Poland)
 The British Museum
 Arts Council of Great Britain
 The Metropolitan Museum of Art, New York
 Museum of Modern Art, New York
 National Museum of Asian Art, Smithsonian Institution
 Museum of Fine Arts, Boston
 The Art Institute of Chicago
 Brooklyn Museum
 Jewish Museum (Manhattan), New York
 Fine Arts Museums of San Francisco 
 Los Angeles County Museum of Art
 Asian Art Museum, San Francisco
 Library of Congress
 Cleveland Museum of Art, Ohio
 Des Moines Art Center, Iowa
 Fogg Art Museum, Harvard University
 Georgetown University Library
 Mead Art Museum at Amherst College
 Jordan Schnitzer Museum of Art, University of Oregon
 Medici Museum of Art
 Smart Museum of Art, University of Chicago
 University of Saint Joseph Art Museum, West Hartford, Connecticut
 Minneapolis Institute of Art, Minnesota

Books 
 JAPANESE PRINTS OF THE TWENTIETH CENTURY: IKEDA MASUO, ARAKAWA SHUSAKU, NODA TETSUYA - HOWARD AND CAROLINE PORTER COLLECTION, Kristin L Spangenberg, Cincinnati Museum Association, 1975
 TETSUYA NODA THE WORKS 1964 - 1978, Yoshiaki Tono, Fuji Television Gallery Co., Ltd, 1978
 TETSUYA NODA WORKS 1982 - 1983, Yoshiaki Tono, Fuji Television Gallery Co., Ltd, 1983
 THE WORLD OF TETSUYA NODA: PRINTMAKER'S DIARY, SUMMER 1984 (ʻOlamo shel Ṭeṭsuyah Nodah : yomano shel madpis, ḳayits 1984), Tetsuya Noda, Nehemia Hartuv, Eli Lancman, Pnina Rosenberg, The Tikotin Museum of Japanese Art, 1984
 TETSUYA NODA WORKS 1983 - 1987, Takahiko Okada, Fuji Television Gallery Co., Ltd, 1987
 TETSUYA NODA THE WORKS II 1978 - 1992, Yusuke Nakahara, Fuji Television Gallery Co., Ltd, 1992
 TETSUYA NODA THE WORKS III 1992 - 2000, Daniel Bell, Fuji Television Gallery Co., Ltd, 2001
 DAYS IN A LIFE: THE ART OF TETSUYA NODA, Robert Flynn Johnson, Asian Art Museum – Chong-Moon Lee Center for Asian Art and Culture (San Francisco, United States), 2004 
 TETSUYA NODA THE WORKS IV 1999 - 2005, Robert Flynn Johnson, Fuji Television Gallery Co., Ltd, 2005
 TETSUYA NODA: DIARY, Hideyuki Kido, Center for Contemporary Graphic Art, 2006
 TETSUYA NODA COMPLETE WORKS V 2006 - 2013, Lawrence Smith, Andrew Bae Gallery, 2014
 TETSUYA NODA THE WORKS 1964 - 2016, Tetsuya Noda, Yoshiaki Tono, Yusuke Nakahara, Daniel Bell, Robert Flynn Johnson, Lawrence Smith, Abe Publishing, 2016 
 THE DIARY OF TETSUYA NODA: STEVEN CO COLLECTION, Ditas R. Samson, Steven Co, Tadayoshi Nakabayashi (中林忠良), Ayala Foundation, 2016 
 YOUR HAND IN MINE, TETSUYA NODA (DIARY) SELECTED WORKS - STEVEN CO COLLECTION, Joey Ho Chong I, Steven Co, Arts Empowering Lab, 2019 
 TETSUYA NODA: A VARIATION OF MIMEOGRAPH - Steven Co Collection, Yung Sau-mui, Steven Co, Hong Kong Open Printshop, 2022 
 NODA TETSUYA'S DIARY OF CONTEMPORARY JAPANESE PRINTS - Steven Co Collection, Florian Knothe, Kuldip Kaur Singh, Steven Co, University Museum and Art Gallery, The University of Hong Kong, 2023

In popular culture 
 Noda's work "Diary: Aug 22nd '68" became the cover of Volume 2 1969 issue of La Gravure (季刊版画), a Japanese magazine on print art.
 Noda's work "Diary: Perhaps Sept. 15th last year" appeared as an ad for Xerox's "Men & Civilization" (人間と文明) campaign in 1970.
 Noda appeared in an ad for the motorcycle model called Bobby for the Yamaha Motor Co., Ltd.'s in 1976.
 Noda's work "Diary: April 7th '75" became the poster for Amnesty International Japanese Section in the 80's.
 Noda's work "Diary: Aug 22nd '68" became the cover of Autumn 1990 issue of The Wilson Quarterly, a magazine published by the Woodrow Wilson International Center for Scholars in Washington, D.C.
 Noda's work "Diary: Sept. 2nd '05, in Weed, California" became the cover of Volume 134 2006 issue of Hanga Deijutsu (版畫芸術), a Japanese magazine on print art. 
 Zooming in Togliattigrad, an Italian indie band, in their self-titled EP (2015), included a track entitled 野田 哲也 (Noda Tetsuya). The inspiration came when the members (Carlo Maria Toller, Andrea Marazzi and Lorenzo Firmi) saw Noda’s retrospective show at The British Museum. On same EP, the band uses one of Noda's work entitled, "Diary: Sept. 1st '74" for its cover. In 2016, the band was invited to provide a soundtrack to accompany the exhibit The Diary of Tetsuya Noda. The track entitled The Diary of Tetsuya Noda runs 52:49 minutes. In the same year, British artist Feea produced a remix of 野田 哲也 (Noda Tetsuya).

References

External links 
British Museum
Days in a Life: The Art of Tetsuya Noda by Robert Flynn Johnson
The list of ”The Unfinished Century：Legacies of 20th Century Art”

1940 births
Japanese artists
Living people
People from Uki, Kumamoto
Columbia University faculty
Artists from Kumamoto Prefecture